The Chennai Citi Centre is a shopping mall in Mylapore, Chennai, India. It opened on 3 March 2006 and is located on Radhakrishnan Salai. According to Cushman and Wakefield, a global real estate consultancy firm, it is one of the most expensive shopping malls in Chennai.

References

Shopping malls in Chennai
Shopping malls established in 2006
2006 establishments in Tamil Nadu